Crataegus opaca, known as the western mayhaw, is a shrub or small tree of the southern United States. It is one of several species of hawthorn with fruits known as "mayhaws".

Description 
It has a tall and narrow trunk with a rounded crown and spiny branches. It has oval, dark green leaves and when in bloom, clusters of pink or white flowers. Its fruits are relatively large and have a cranberry-red color when ripe. Blooms usually appear between February and March, and the fruit ripens from May to June.

Habitat 
This species prefers wet, rich, and acidic soils, and is located in low woods, creeks, and river bottoms, often in standing water. Its native distribution ranges from Alabama west to Texas, and north to Arkansas.

Uses 
The fruits, known as mayhaws, are commonly used to make jams, preserves, and jellies. While the fruits are bitter raw, the jelly produced from them is highly prized for its flavor.

References

opaca
Flora of Alabama
Flora of Texas
Flora of Louisiana
Flora of Mississippi